Mary Antona Ebo, FSM, (born Elizabeth Louise "Betty Lou" Ebo; April 10, 1924 – November 11, 2017) was an American nun, hospital administrator, and civil rights activist. She was the first African-American woman to head a Catholic hospital, and is known for marching with Martin Luther King Jr. in Selma in 1965, famously saying "I'm here because I'm a Negro, a nun, a Catholic, and because I want to bear witness."

Early life and education 
Ebo was born in Bloomington, Illinois, the daughter of Daniel Ebo and Louise Teal Ebo. She lived at the McLean County Home for Colored Children with her two older siblings from 1930 to 1942, after her mother's death and her father's unemployment during the Great Depression. She was hospitalized for long periods of her childhood, once for an infected thumb requiring amputation, and later with tuberculosis. 

In 1944, she was the first black student to graduate from Holy Trinity High School. She converted to Catholicism in 1942, and trained as a nurse the St. Mary's (Colored) Infirmary School of Nursing in St. Louis.

As a Catholic nun, she pursued further education, earning a bachelor's degree in medical record library science from Saint Louis University in 1962, and two master's degrees, one in hospital executive development (1970) from Saint Louis University, and one in theology of health care (1978) from Aquinas Institute of Theology. From 1979, she held a chaplain's certificate from the National Association of Catholic Chaplains.

Career

Medical and pastoral work 
Ebo was one of the first three black women to join the Sisters of St. Mary in 1946, and became Sister Mary Antona when she took her final vows in 1954. She worked in medical records at Firmin Desloge Hospital from 1955 to 1961, and was director of medical records at St. Mary's Infirmary from 1962 to 1967. In 1967, she was named executive director of St. Clare's Hospital in Baraboo, Wisconsin, the first African-American woman to be head of a Catholic hospital.  In 1974 she was named executive director of the Wisconsin Conference of Catholic Hospitals. She worked at Catholic hospitals in Madison, Wisconsin, and at the University of Mississippi Medical Center. From 1992 to 2008, she was a pastoral associate at St. Nicholas Church in St. Louis.

Civil rights activism 
With encouragement from her mother superior, Ebo and five other nuns joined the Martin Luther King's march in Selma in 1965, wearing their orders' full habits. Ebo's story was included in the documentary Sisters of Selma: Bearing Witness for Change (2007). In 1968, Ebo was a founder of the National Black Sisters' Conference, and president of the conference from 1980 to 1982. In 1989, she received the conference's Harriet Tubman Award for service and leadership. She served on the Human Rights Commission of the Archdiocese of St. Louis, and was a member of the Missouri Catholic Conference on Social Concerns.

In 1999, she received the Eucharist from Pope John Paul II, in a group of congregants including Rosa Parks, when the pontiff visited St. Louis. In 2013 she attended a commemoration of the 1965 march and cross the Edmund Pettus Bridge with Congressman John Lewis. In 2014, in her nineties, Ebo gave a message at a prayer service in Ferguson following the death of Michael Brown Jr.

Death 
Sister Mary Antona Ebo died in 2017, aged 93, at the Sarah Community, a retirement home in Bridgeton, Missouri, after 71 years in religious life.

Legacy 
A seminar room at the Cardinal Rigali Center in St. Louis is named for Ebo.

References

External links 

 A 2017 segment of Living St. Louis about Ebo, from Nine PBS, on YouTube.
 A Celebration of Sister Antona Ebo, a video of a memorial program for Ebo at the Missouri History Museum, on YouTube.

1924 births
2017 deaths
20th-century Roman Catholics
21st-century Roman Catholics
African-American nurses
African-American Roman Catholic religious sisters and nuns
American chaplains
American civil rights activists
American hospital administrators
American women nurses
Converts to Roman Catholicism from Baptist denominations
Franciscan nuns
People from Bloomington, Illinois
Saint Louis University alumni